"Hole in My Soul" is a power ballad performed by American hard rock band Aerosmith.  It was written by Steven Tyler, Joe Perry, and professional songwriter and longtime Aerosmith collaborator Desmond Child.  It was released as the second major single from Nine Lives in 1997.

Chart positions
The song reached #51 on the Billboard Hot 100, #4 on the Mainstream Rock Tracks chart, #29 in the United Kingdom, and #4 in Latvia.

Track listing

Hole in My Soul - yellow - 450124

Hole in My Soul - red - 450155

In concert
In concert, Steven Tyler has been known to substitute some lines with racier lyrics.  On a live version of the song from the A Little South of Sanity album, Tyler sings "I fuck with my boots on cause you fuck with my head" instead of the studio version lyrics "I sleep with my boots on, but you're still in my head."

The band played the song heavily on their lengthy Nine Lives Tour from 1997–1999, but has almost never played it since.

Music video
Directed by Andy Morahan, the video featured a nerdy high school student (played by Branden Williams), often picked on, who is unsuccessful in finding the right girl. He uses his scientific genius to build a cloning machine and creates a beautiful girl (played by Eva Mendes), but she meets someone else at a party. He creates another who he also loses to a football player (played by Seann William Scott).  A classmate (played by Alexandra Holden) discovers his machine and stops him from creating another girl for himself, and he realizes the girl for him had been there all along.

References

External links

Aerosmith songs
1997 singles
Columbia Records singles
Hard rock ballads
Music videos directed by Andy Morahan
Song recordings produced by Kevin Shirley
Songs written by Desmond Child
Songs written by Steven Tyler
Songs written by Joe Perry (musician)